Khushi is a 2003 Indian Kannada romance film starring Vijay Raghavendra, Tarun Chandra, Harish Prabhath and Sindhu Menon in the lead roles along with Ananth Nag and Avinash in other prominent roles. The film is directed by the debutant film maker Prakash. The score and soundtrack was by Gurukiran.

Cast
Vijay Raghavendra as Vijay
Tarun Chandra as Ajay
Harish Prabhath as Shashank
Sindhu Menon as Chaya
Ananth Nag as Rajendra Prasad
Avinash as Durga Prasad
Madhuri Bhattacharya as simran
Chaitra Hallikeri as Priyanka
Chitra Shenoy
Ravindra nath 
Poorna chandra Tejasvi
Vishal Hegde 
M. S. Umesh 
Mandeep Rai 
Dwarakish
Sihi Kahi Chandru
Ramesh Bhat
Kishori Ballal as Ajji
Jean as Priyanka's friend

Soundtrack

References

External links

Movie review

2003 films
2000s Kannada-language films
Films set in Bangalore
Films shot in Bangalore
Indian romantic drama films
Films scored by Gurukiran
2003 directorial debut films
2003 romantic drama films
Indian coming-of-age drama films
2000s coming-of-age drama films